Vanovice is a municipality and village in Blansko District in the South Moravian Region of the Czech Republic. It has about 600 inhabitants.

Administrative parts
The village of Drválovice is an administrative part of Vanovice.

References

Villages in Blansko District